Friction idiophones is designation 13 in the Hornbostel-Sachs system of musical instrument classification. These idiophones produce sound by being rubbed either against each other or by means of a non-sounding object. Instruments of this type are not very common; possibly the best known examples are the musical saw and the nail violin.

According to musicologist Curt Sachs:

Friction sticks (131)

131.1 Individual friction sticks.

131.2 Sets of friction sticks.
 Nail violin
 Cristal baschet, preceded by the euphon

131.21 Without direct friction.

131.22 With direct friction.

Friction plaques (132)

132.1 Individual friction plaques.
 Daxophone
 Musical saw
 Triolin
Turntable

132.2 Sets of friction plaques.
 Clavicylinder

Friction vessels (133)

133.1 Individual friction vessels.
 Rainstick
Singing Bowl
 Ekola

133.2 Sets of friction vessels.
 Glass harmonica
 Glass harp
 Terpodion/melodion
 Verrophone

See also
Wind machine

References

 "SVH Classification", Wesleyan.edu.

Notes

 
Lists of percussion instruments
Lists of musical instruments by Hornbostel–Sachs number